Punch-marked coins, also known as Aahat coins, are a type of early coinage of India, dating to between about the 6th and 2nd centuries BC. It was of irregular shape. These coins are found are found over the most parts parts of subcontinent and remained in circulation till the early centuries CE.

History
The study of the relative chronology of these coins has successfully established that the first punch-marked coins initially only had one or two punches, with the number of punches increasing over time.

The first coins in India may have been minted around the 6th century BC by the Mahajanapadas of the Indo-Gangetic Plain. 19th-century proposals which suggested an origin from as early as 1000 BC, independent of the introduction of coins in Asia Minor, are "no longer given any credence".

Silver coins were certainly being produced in the Achaemenid Satrapy  of Gandāra, by the mid-4th century BC, before the Indian campaign of Alexander the Great, in 327 BC, as Plutarch noted Taxiles (Ambhi) of Taxila exchanged coined tribute with Alexander. According to Joe Cribb, Indian punch-marked coins go back to the mid-4th century BC or slightly earlier, and actually started with the punch-marked coinage of the Achaemenids in the Kabul/ Gandhara area.

The coins of this period were punch-marked coins called Puranas, Karshapanas or Pana. Several of these coins had a single symbol, for example, Saurashtra had a humped bull, and Dakshin Panchala had a Swastika, others, like Magadha, had several symbols. These coins were made of silver of a standard weight but with an irregular shape. This was gained by cutting up silver bars and then making the correct weight by cutting the edges of the coin.

They are mentioned in the Manu (c. 200 BC - 200 AD), Panini (bef. 300 BC), and Buddhist Jataka (c. 300 BC - 400 AD), circulating in the North until approximately the beginning of the first century AD, but lasted three centuries longer in the South, i.e. until about 300 AD.

 Shurasena
 Surashtra 
 Early coins of India (400 BC – 100 AD) were made of silver and copper, and bore animal and plant symbols on them.

Greek and Achaemenid coinage in northwestern India (6th century onward)

Coin finds in the Kabul hoard (c. 380 BC), Mir Zakah hoards (c. 100 AD), Taxila Bhir Mound (c. 300 BC), or the Shaikhan Dehri hoard near Pushkalavati have revealed numerous Achaemenid coins as well as many Greek coins from the 5th and 4th centuries BC were circulating in the area, at least as far as the Indus during the reign of the Achaemenids (549 - 330 BCE), who were in control of the areas as far as Gandhara. In 2007 a small coin hoard was discovered at the site of ancient Pushkalavati (Shaikhan Dehri) in Pakistan. The hoard contained a tetradrachm minted in Athens c. 500-480 BC, together with a number of local types as well as silver cast ingots. The Athens coin is the earliest known example of its type to be found so far to the east. While the Mir Zakah hoards offered hundreds of thousands of examples, punched and stamped bars and coins, manufactured between the late 5th century BC, and late 1st century AD.

According to Joe Cribb, these early Greek coins were at the origin of Indian punch-marked coins, the earliest coins developed in India, which used minting technology derived from Greek coinage. Daniel Schlumberger also considers that punch-marked bars, similar to the many punch-marked bars found in northwestern India, initially originated in the Achaemenid Empire, rather than in the Indian heartland:

Mauryan Period (322–185 BC)

During the Mauryan period, punch-marked coins continued to be issued in large quantities. Similarly, the coinage of the Mauryan Empire was an example of the punch-marked coinage of Magadha. Each coin contained on average 50–54 grains of silver depending on wear and 32 rattis in weight, and earlier coins are flatter than later coins. Punches on these coins count to 450 different types with the most common the sun and six-armed symbols, and various forms of geometrical patterns, circles, wheels, human figures, various animals, bows and arrows, hills and trees etc.

In the North, following the fall of the Maurya Empire and the increased influence of the Greco-Bactrians and Indo-Greeks, punch-marked coins were replaced by cast die-struck coins, as visible in the Post-Mauryan coinage of Gandhara.

See also

 Overstrike (numismatics) — where a new design is struck over an existing coin
 Chop marks on coins
 Countermark
 Counterfeit
 Nandipada

References

External links
 The archaic indian punch marked coins – approaches to classification, by Shailendra Bhandare
 India's earliest coinage – punch-marked coins
 Punch-marked coins from Shurasena
 Punch-marked coins from Surashtra

Ancient currencies
Coins of India
Ancient India